Bounds Green Road (A109) is a road in the London Borough of Haringey that runs from the junction of Station Road and the North Circular Road in Bounds Green, to the High Road in Wood Green.

Notable buildings

Among the notable buildings in the road are:
Bounds Green Underground Station
Braemar Avenue Baptist Church which faces Bounds Green Road and is grade II listed.
7 & 9 Bounds Green Road. Grade II listed houses.
The Catharine Smithies obelisk on Trinity Gardens on the east side.
The former home of communist and university administrator Dorothy Galton at number 49.
St. Michael and All Angels Church, Wood Green
Trinity Primary Academy, a grade II listed school.

References

External links

 
Streets in the London Borough of Haringey
Wood Green
Bounds Green